Xanthophyllum heterophyllum is a tree in the family Polygalaceae. The specific epithet  is from the Greek meaning "different leaf", referring to the leaf-like appearance of the axillary buds.

Description
The smooth bark is greyish or yellowish.

Distribution and habitat
Xanthophyllum heterophyllum is endemic to Borneo. Its habitat is lowland forests but can occur at up to  altitude.

References

heterophyllum
Endemic flora of Borneo
Trees of Borneo
Plants described in 1982